Black Duck Creek is a stream in the Northern Region of Manitoba, Canada. It is in the Hudson Bay drainage basin and is a right tributary of the Minago River.

Black Duck Creek begins at Black Duck Lake and travels east, then north before reaching its mouth at Drunken Lake, which drains via the Minago River and the Nelson River to Hudson Bay.

See also
List of rivers of Manitoba

References

Rivers of Northern Manitoba
Tributaries of Hudson Bay